The Fagani or Faghani language is a member of the family of San Cristobal languages, and is spoken in the northwest part of the island of Makira, formerly known as San Cristobal in the Solomon Islands.

External links 
 Materials on Fagani are included in the open access Arthur Capell collection (AC2) held by Paradisec.

References

Languages of the Solomon Islands
Malaita-San Cristobal languages
Vulnerable languages